Senator Pryor may refer to:

David Pryor (born 1934), U.S. Senator from Arkansas from 1979 to 1997
Luke Pryor (1820–1900), U.S. Senator from Alabama in 1880
Mark Pryor (born 1963), U.S. Senator from Arkansas from 2003 to 2015